Wickaboxet State Forest is a 678 acre state management area on Plain Meeting House Road in West Greenwich, Rhode Island. It was founded in 1932.

References

State parks of Rhode Island
Protected areas of Providence County, Rhode Island
West Greenwich, Rhode Island
Protected areas established in 1932
1932 establishments in Rhode Island